Pandanus aldabraensis is a species of plant in the family Pandanaceae. It is endemic to Seychelles.  It is threatened by habitat loss.

References

Trees of Seychelles
aldabraensis
Vulnerable plants
Endemic flora of Seychelles
Flora of Aldabra
Taxonomy articles created by Polbot